Statistics of the Primera División de México for the 1956–57 season.

Overview
Monterrey was promoted to Primera División.

The season was contested by 13 teams, and Guadalajara won the championship.

Monterrey was relegated to Segunda División.

Due to economical problems Puebla advised the league that the club would not be playing next season and the club would return for the 1957-58 season.

Teams

League standings

Results

References
Mexico - List of final tables (RSSSF)

1956-57
Mex
1956–57 in Mexican football